The Sidrat al-Muntaha is a large lote tree or Sidr tree that marks the utmost boundary in the seventh heaven, which no one can pass. It is called Sidrat al-Muntaha because the knowledge of the angels stops at that point, and no one has gone beyond it.  During the Isra and Mi'raj, Muhammad PBUH traveled with the angel Gabriel to the tree where Gabriel stopped. Beyond the tree, Allah instructed Muhammad PBUH about the five daily prayers.

The Sadratu'l-Muntahá is also used to refer to the Manifestation of God a number of times in the Bahá’í Writings.

Quran 

The tree is also referred to in Sura 53 verse 14-16, Sura 34 verse 16 and Sura 56, verse 28.

Sura 53, verses 11-18 reads:

Sura 34, verses 15-17 reads:

Sura 56, verses 27-34 reads:

Meaning 

Abdullah Yusuf Ali, whose The Holy Qur'an: Text, Translation and Commentary is among the most widely known English versions of the Qur'an, explained that this tree "marked the bounds of heavenly knowledge as revealed to men, beyond which neither Angels nor men could pass."

George Sale, the 18th century English scholar, has "beyond which Angels themselves must not pass; or, as some rather imagine, beyond which no creature's knowledge can extend."<ref>Sale, George (n.d.) The Koran" Sir John Lubbock's hundred books. George Routledge and sons, London. p.323 note r</ref> Sale also notes that one commentator states that line 16 refers to the "host of angels worshipping" around the tree and another that it is about the birds which sit on its branches.

The 19th century English explorer, Richard Burton reported seeing an ancient Sidr tree in Al-Masjid Al-Nabawi in Madinah. It was in a garden dedicated to Hazrat Sayyida Fatima, may Allah's blessings upon her. The fruit from the tree was being sold to pilgrims and its leaves used for washing dead bodies.

 Use as a symbol 
The lote-tree is used as a symbol, for example, by the Qatar Foundation: "The Sidra tree, growing strong and proud in the harshest of environments, has been a symbol of perseverance and nourishment across the borders of the Arab world. What is the significance of this glorious tree? With its roots bound in the soil of this world and its branches reaching upwards toward perfection, it is a symbol of solidarity and determination; it reminds us that the goals of this world are not incompatible with the goals of the spirit." The evergreen tree Ziziphus spina-christi represents this symbol in natural form.

 See also 
 Plants in Islam
 Manifestation of God (Baháʼí Faith)
 Tree of life (Quran)
 Tree of life
 Ziziphus Jujube
 Ziziphus lotus
 Ziziphus spina-christi

 References 

Further reading
 Ayoub, Mahmoud. The Qur'an and Its Interpreters: The House of 'Imran''. SUNY Press. Albany, NY: 1992. 
 Lambden, Stephen. Biblical, Islamic and Babi-Baha'i Studies: Section "Sidrat al-Muntaha".

External links 
 Glossary of Islamic terms
 Sidrat al-Muntaha
 Miracle of Isra and Miraj

Arabic words and phrases
Islamic eschatology
Islamic terminology
Bahá'í terminology
Trees in Islam